Robert Simpson Wood (1887 – April 20, 1949) was an American college football coach and mayor of Athens, Ohio. He served as the head football coach at his alma mater, Ohio University, from 1909 to 1910, compiling a record of 2–10–3. He later served as the mayor of Athens from 1930 to 1931.

Wood died on April 20, 1949, at his sister-in-law's home in Columbus, Ohio.

Head coaching record

References

External links
 

1887 births
1949 deaths
Ohio Bobcats football coaches
Ohio Bobcats football players
People from Athens, Ohio
Mayors of places in Ohio
Coaches of American football from Ohio
Players of American football from Ohio